Nathan Mironovich Milstein ( – December 21, 1992) was a Russian-born American virtuoso violinist.

Widely considered one of the finest violinists of the 20th century, Milstein was known for his interpretations of Bach's solo violin works and for works from the Romantic period.  He was also known for his long career: he performed at a high level into his mid-80s, retiring only after suffering a broken hand.

Biography
Milstein was born in Odessa, Russian Empire, the fourth child of seven, to a middle-class Jewish family with no musical background. It was a concert by the 11-year-old Jascha Heifetz that inspired his parents to make a violinist out of Milstein. As a child of seven, he started violin studies (as suggested by his parents, to keep him out of mischief) with the eminent violin pedagogue Pyotr Stolyarsky, also the teacher of renowned violinist David Oistrakh.

When Milstein was 11, Leopold Auer invited him to become one of his students at the St. Petersburg Conservatory. Milstein reminisced:

Every little boy who had the dream of playing better than the other boy wanted to go to Auer. He was a very gifted man and a good teacher. I used to go to the Conservatory twice a week for classes. I played every lesson with forty or fifty people sitting and listening. Two pianos were in the classroom and a pianist accompanied us. When Auer was sick, he would ask me to come to his home.

Milstein may in fact have been the last of the great Russian violinists to have had personal contact with Auer.  Auer did not name Milstein in his memoirs but mentions "two boys from Odessa ... both of whom disappeared after I left St. Petersburg in June 1917." Neither is Milstein's name in the registry of the St Petersburg Conservatory.

Milstein also studied with Eugène Ysaÿe in Belgium. He told film-maker Christopher Nupen, director of Nathan Milstein – In Portrait, that he learned almost nothing from Ysaÿe but enjoyed his company enormously. In a 1977 interview printed in High Fidelity, he said, "I went to Ysaÿe in 1926 but he never paid any attention to me. I think it might have been better this way. I had to think for myself."

Milstein met Vladimir Horowitz and his pianist sister Regina in 1921 when he played a recital in Kiev. They invited him for tea at their parents' home. Milstein later said, "I came for tea and stayed three years." Milstein and Horowitz performed together, as "children of the revolution", throughout the Soviet Union and struck up a lifelong friendship. In 1925, they went on a concert tour of Western Europe together.

In 1929, Milstein made his American debut with Leopold Stokowski and the Philadelphia Orchestra. He eventually settled in New York and became an American citizen. He toured repeatedly throughout Europe, maintaining residences in London and Paris.

A transcriber and composer, Milstein arranged many works for violin and wrote his own cadenzas for many concertos. He was obsessed with articulating each note perfectly and would often spend long periods of time working out fingerings which would make passages sound more articulated. One of his best-known compositions is Paganiniana, a set of variations on various themes from the works of Niccolò Paganini.

After playing many different violins in his earlier days, Milstein finally acquired the 1716 "Goldman" Stradivarius in 1945 which he used for the rest of his life. He renamed this Stradivarius the "Maria Teresa" in honor of his daughter Maria (presently wife of Marchese GiovanAngelo Theodoli-Braschi, Duke of Nemi and Grandee of Spain, descendant from Pope Pius VI) and his wife Therese. He also performed on the 1710 ex-"Dancla" Stradivarius for a short period.

In 1948, Milstein's recording of Felix Mendelssohn's Violin Concerto in E minor, with Bruno Walter conducting the New York Philharmonic, had the distinction of being the first catalogue item in Columbia's newly introduced long-playing twelve-inch 33 rpm vinyl records, Columbia ML 4001.

Milstein was awarded the Légion d'honneur by France in 1968 and received a Grammy Award for his recording of Bach's Sonatas and Partitas in 1975. He was also awarded Kennedy Center honors by US President Ronald Reagan.

A recital he gave in Stockholm in June 1986, one of his last performances, was recorded in its entirety and shows the remarkable condition of his technique at age 82.   A fall shortly afterward in which he severely broke his left hand ended his career.

During the late 1980s, Milstein published his memoirs, From Russia to the West, in which he discussed his life of constant performance and socializing. Milstein discusses the personalities of important composers such as Alexander Glazunov, Sergei Prokofiev, Sergei Rachmaninoff and Igor Stravinsky and conductors such as Arturo Toscanini and Leopold Stokowski, all of whom he knew personally. He also discusses his best friends, pianist Vladimir Horowitz, cellist Gregor Piatigorsky and ballet director George Balanchine, as well as other violinists such as Fritz Kreisler and David Oistrakh.

Milstein was married twice, remaining married to his second wife, Therese, until his death.  He died of a heart attack in London on December 21, 1992, 23 days before his 89th birthday. Therese died in 1999 aged 83.

Notes

References
 From Russia to the West: The Musical Memoirs & Reminiscences of Nathan Milstein by Nathan Milstein & Solomon Volkov. Limelight Edition, 1991.
 Nathan Milstein by Tully Potter, 1995. From CD booklet notes (Testament SBT 1047).
Henry Roth, Nathan Milstein, in Violin Virtuosos, From Paganini to the 21st Century, Los Angeles, California Classics Books, 1997, pp. 130–138
Paolo Cecchinelli, Nathan Milstein. Paganiniana. Variations for violin solo, in Quaderni dell’Istituto di Studi Paganiniani, n. 12 (2000), pp. 25–36.
Beethoven and Brahms violin concertos. (2001) EMI Records Ltd. Barcode 0724356758353

External links
 Geometry.net
 Inkpot.com biography
 archive.org - Nathan Milstein's recordings

1904 births
1992 deaths
Musicians from Odesa
People from Kherson Governorate
Soviet emigrants to the United States
Soviet classical violinists
20th-century classical violinists
Ukrainian classical violinists
Jews from the Russian Empire
American classical violinists
Male classical violinists
American male violinists
Jewish classical violinists
Jewish violinists
Saint Petersburg Conservatory alumni
Chevaliers of the Légion d'honneur
Grammy Award winners
Kennedy Center honorees
Odesa Jews
Jewish Ukrainian musicians
20th-century American male musicians
Russian classical musicians
Russian violinists
Russian classical violinists
Russian Jews
20th-century Russian Jews
20th-century Russian musicians
20th-century Russian male musicians
20th-century American violinists